Valéria Gyenge (born 3 April 1933) is a Hungarian swimmer who won the 400 m freestyle event at the 1952 Summer Olympics. She remained a leader in this event until 1956, but finished in a disappointing eighth place at the 1956 Olympics. In 1978, she was inducted into the International Swimming Hall of Fame.

Family
Gyenge was a daughter-in-law of János Garay, a 1928 Olympic fencing champion who died in a German concentration camp in 1945. Her sisters Judy and Suzy as well as her sister-in-law Mària were also swimmers. After 1956 Olympics Gyenge moved to Canada, together with her fiancé and future husband János Garai, a water polo player. In Canada she swam for the EMAC Club in Toronto for a few months and then coached swimming for three years before becoming a photographer. Her daughter Soo Garay became an actress.

See also
 List of members of the International Swimming Hall of Fame
World record progression 800 metres freestyle

References

External links

1933 births
Living people
Hungarian female freestyle swimmers
Olympic swimmers of Hungary
Swimmers at the 1952 Summer Olympics
Swimmers at the 1956 Summer Olympics
Olympic gold medalists for Hungary
Swimmers from Budapest
World record setters in swimming
European Aquatics Championships medalists in swimming
Medalists at the 1952 Summer Olympics
Olympic gold medalists in swimming
20th-century Hungarian women
21st-century Hungarian women